Stephen John Shutt (born July 1, 1952) is a Canadian former professional ice hockey player and NHL Hall of Famer who played 13 seasons in the National Hockey League (NHL), 12 seasons for the Montreal Canadiens and 1 season for the Los Angeles Kings. He is in the Hockey Hall of Fame. While playing for the Canadiens he captured 5 Stanley Cups in 1973, 1976, 1977, 1978, and 1979.

Playing career
As a youth, he played in the 1964 and 1965 Quebec International Pee-Wee Hockey Tournaments with minor ice hockey teams from Toronto.

Partnered with Jacques Lemaire and Guy Lafleur on the Montreal Canadiens, to form the top line in the NHL, Shutt became the first left-winger in NHL history to score 60 goals in a single season, with the historic goal being scored on April 3, 1977, against the Washington Capitals.

During his career with Montreal, he was named to the NHL First All-Star team in 1977, and the NHL Second All-Star team in 1978 and 1980.

Playing style

Despite being of relatively small stature and possessing average skating ability, Shutt had remarkable spatial awareness and was very positionally sound. He was consistently able to get into dead areas of coverage on the ice, either by anticipating where the puck was going to be or by arriving late on a play.

He was also a masterful goal scorer, possessing a diverse arsenal of shots. His wrist shot was known for its superior accuracy, and Shutt was noted for his ability to consistently pick corners or hit the five-hole.

Moreover, Shutt was famous for the power and unusual level of accuracy found in his slap shot, which he could get off in full stride while coming down the wing. Shutt was frequently able to let fly one or two steps inside the offensive zone and beat goalies clean. New York Islanders goaltender Billy Smith, who faced the Habs many times in the 70s and 80s, gave credit to the superiority of Shutt's slapshot:

“He had a great shot. Unbelievable shot. He’d come across the blue line and he could tee it up better than anybody. And he was accurate, which is scary for someone with a slap shot.”

In addition to having a superb slap shot on the fly, the precision and consistency of Shutt's one timer also earned him a spot as the point man on the Habs’ power play over many of the defencemen on his team.

However, the most noteworthy part of Shutt's game was his ability to collect rebounds and turn them into so-called “garbage goals”. As Shutt himself claimed, “I’m the only guy that could score goals and make it boring”. This particular element of Shutt's playing style fit him into a long line of “garbage collectors” who earned a majority of their goals from around the crease – players like Nels Stewart and Gordie Drillon before him, his contemporary Phil Esposito and skaters of a later generation such as Corey Perry. He had exceptional hand-eye coordination, and a deft knack for converting loose pucks into deflections – even batting in pucks which had bounced one or two feet off the ice. Noted author and sports columnist Brian McFarlane claimed that Shutt had the fastest set of hands around the net during his time in the NHL, with an ability to corral the puck with his skates as well as protect it with his body and stick.
Shutt gave a simple explanation for how he developed his excellent reflexes as a child: “We always had about fifteen kids on the ice, and so there wasn’t a lot of room. And so you had to be really quick with your hands.”

Career statistics

Regular season and playoffs

* Stanley Cup Champion.

International

Post playing career
Following his playing career, Shutt worked as a television hockey commentator. From 1993 to 1997, he worked on the Canadiens coaching staff as an assistant coach on both the staffs of Jacques Demers and Mario Tremblay.

Following his assistant coaching duties with the Montreal Canadiens, Shutt joined Toromont Industries as Manager of Recreational Facilities and Services and has been with them for the past 19 years.

On November 22, 2003, Shutt participated with the Canadiens' old-timers against the Edmonton Oilers oldtimers in the Heritage Classic, the first outdoor game in the history of the NHL played at Commonwealth Stadium, in Edmonton, Alberta. Shutt also tours Canada and the U.S. as a playing member of the Oldtimers' Hockey Challenge, raising money for charitable causes.

See also
List of NHL players with 100-point seasons

References

External links

1952 births
Living people
Canadian colour commentators
Canadian ice hockey left wingers
Canadian polo players
Canadian television sportscasters
Edmonton Oilers announcers
Hockey Hall of Fame inductees
Sportspeople from North York
Ice hockey people from Toronto
Los Angeles Kings players
Montreal Canadiens announcers
Montreal Canadiens draft picks
Montreal Canadiens players
National Hockey League broadcasters
National Hockey League first-round draft picks
Nova Scotia Voyageurs players
People from Willowdale, Toronto
Stanley Cup champions
Toronto Marlboros players